Prohimerta is an Asian genus of bush crickets found in Indochina (mostly Vietnam) and China.

Species 
, subgenera and species include:

Prohimerta (Anisotima) Bey-Bienko, 1951
 Prohimerta choui (Kang & Yang, 1989)
 Prohimerta dispar (Bey-Bienko, 1951)
 Prohimerta fujianensis Gorochov & Kang, 2002
 Prohimerta guizhouensis Gorochov & Kang, 2002
 Prohimerta hubeiensis Gorochov & Kang, 2002
 Prohimerta laocai Gorochov, 2010
 Prohimerta sichuanensis Gorochov & Kang, 2002
 Prohimerta vieta Gorochov, 2003
 Prohimerta yunnanea (Bey-Bienko, 1962)

Prohimerta (Prohimerta) Hebard, 1922
 Prohimerta annamensis Hebard, 1922 - type species (locality: Phuc Son, central Vietnam)
 Prohimerta maculosa (Krausze, 1903)

References

Phaneropterinae
Tettigoniidae genera
Orthoptera of Indo-China